John Shaw & Sons (Salford) Ltd v Shaw [1935] 2 KB 113 is a UK company law case, concerning the proper interpretation of a company's articles of association.

Facts
Peter, John and Percy Shaw had a company together. They had an argument over owing the company money, and the result was a settlement. Peter and John would resign as governing directors, promised they would not take part in financial affairs, and independent directors would be appointed and given control over the company's financial affairs. When the independent directors required John and Peter to pay money to the company, John and Peter refused. The independent directors resolved to bring a claim against them. Just before the hearing, an extraordinary general meeting was called, where as the majority shareholders Peter and John procured a resolution to discontinue the litigation. The company, and Percy, contended the resolution was ineffective.

At first instance Du Parcq J disregarded the resolution and gave judgment for the company. John appealed.

Judgment
The Court of Appeal upheld the judge, so that the shareholders could not circumvent the company's constitution and order the directors to discontinue litigation. Greer LJ said the following.

Roche LJ and Slesser LJ agreed, although for slightly differing reasons.

See also

UK company law
Russian Commercial and Industrial Bank v Comptoir d'Estcompte de Mulhouse [1923] 2 KB 630

Notes

References

United Kingdom company case law
Court of Appeal (England and Wales) cases
1935 in case law
1935 in British law